The Women's floor competition at the 2015 Southeast Asian Games was held on 10 June 2015 at the Bishan Sports Hall in Singapore.

Schedule
All times are Singapore Standard Time (UTC+8).

Qualification

Qualification took place on 7 June 2015 as part of the team and individual qualification event.

Results

References 

Women's floor
Women's sports competitions in Singapore
2015 in women's gymnastics